"Now You See Her, Now You Don't" is a song by Canadian group Crash Test Dummies and was the second promotional single from their 2010 album Oooh La La!.  As with most songs from the album, the song is based on an Optigan melody, with this song emulating a Big band swing style.

Lyrics and interpretation
The song has been described as a "quirky little tune about an uncatchable girl" and is considered to be one of the most surprising and best songs on the album

It's from the lyrics of this song where the album gets the title Oooh La-La!.

Music video
The music video for the song is directed by Lynne Harty and uses a pixilation animation effect.  The action of the video is displayed in a center partition and consists of various women, along with Brad Roberts, posing and dancing in front of the camera.

References

External links

2010 singles
Crash Test Dummies songs
Songs written by Brad Roberts
Songs written by Stewart Lerman
Song recordings produced by Stewart Lerman
2010 songs